Natchez Street Historic District is a  historic district in Franklin, Tennessee that was listed on the National Register of Historic Places in 2004.

It includes an area also known as Baptist Neck.  Years of historic significance for the district include 1881, 1907, and 1925.  It includes Shotgun and Bungalow/Craftsman architecture.  When listed, the district included 65 contributing buildings, eight contributing objects and 27 non-contributing buildings, over its  area.

The Natchez Street historic district is one of five National Register historic districts in the city of Franklin. Unlike the other four National Register historic districts in the city, this district is not also designated as local historic districts by city ordinance, so it is not subject to local design review. Franklin has seven local historic districts.

References

Historic districts in Williamson County, Tennessee
American Craftsman architecture in Tennessee
Bungalow architecture in Tennessee
Shotgun architecture in Tennessee
Historic districts on the National Register of Historic Places in Tennessee
National Register of Historic Places in Williamson County, Tennessee